Milwaukee shooting may refer to:

Shooting of Dontre Hamilton, the 2014 fatal shooting by a Milwaukee police officer
2016 Milwaukee riots, a series of riots that occurred after the fatal shooting of Sylville Smith by Milwaukee police
Milwaukee brewery shooting, a 2020 mass shooting at the Molson Coors Beverage Company